Gabriel Kakuru, professionally known as Gabriel K, is a Ugandan R&B/Soul singer-songwriter and businessman. His debut studio album Done Waiting was released in May 2019 and his second album Love Ocean in February 2020.

Career
Gabriel K joined the music industry as a curtain raiser for other musicians in the 2000s. He then gave music a break and joined radio and television, where he worked as a radio presenter on Monitor FM (now KFM) and also as television host on the defunct WBS Television and CCTV. He retired from radio and television and invested in billboard advertising in the  East African region.  He returned into music with his debut studio album titled Done Waiting in 2018.

His second album titled Love Ocean was released in February 2020. His March and April scheduled concert tours to promote both albums were cancelled due to the COVID-19 pandemic and lockdown. He then held an online concert called We Just Want Love concert and performed all songs from his two albums.

Gabriel K was discovered by Aflik TV which signed him for his debut acting role in a Nollywood film.

Discography

References

1986 births
Living people
21st-century Ugandan male singers